Gilbert Hill is a  monolith column of black basalt rock at Andheri, in Mumbai, India. The rock has a sheer vertical face and was formed when molten lava was squeezed out of the Earth's clefts during the  Mesozoic Era about 66 million years ago. The volcanic eruptions were also responsible for the destruction of plant and animal life during that era.
According to experts, this rare geological phenomenon was the remnant of a ridge and had clusters of vertical columns in nearby Jogeshwari which were quarried off two decades ago. These vertical columns are similar to the Devils Tower National Monument in Wyoming, and the Devils Postpile National Monument in eastern California, USA. Gilbert Hill was declared a National Park in 1952 by the Central Government under the Forest Act. In 2007, after years of lobbying by geologists, the hill was declared a Grade II heritage structure by the Municipal Corporation of Greater Mumbai  (MCGM), and all quarrying and other activities around the monument were prohibited. Over the period of time, Gilbert Hill has faced severe erosion problems too.

Atop the rock column, two Hindu temples, the Gaodevi and Durgamata temples, set in a small garden, are accessed by a steep staircase carved into the rock.  The hill offers a panoramic view of suburban Mumbai.

Efforts are being made to convert Gilbert Hill into a tourist attraction and include it as a stop on a tour of Mumbai by Maharashtra Tourism Development Corporation.

Gallery

See also 
 Devils Postpile National Monument
 Deccan Trap

References 

Hills of Mumbai
Parks in Mumbai
National parks in Maharashtra
Rock formations of India
Landforms of Maharashtra
Buttes